The Overseas Press Club of America (OPC) was founded in 1939 in New York City by a group of foreign correspondents. The wire service reporter Carol Weld was a founding member, as was the war correspondent Peggy Hull. The club seeks to maintain an international association of journalists working in the United States and abroad, to encourage the highest standards of professional integrity and skill in the reporting of news, to help educate a new generation of journalists, to contribute to the freedom and independence of journalists and the press throughout the world, and to work toward better communication and understanding among people. The organization has approximately 500 members who are media industry leaders.

Every April, the OPC holds a dinner to award excellence in journalism for the previous year. The awards are juried by industry peers. The organization also has a foundation that distributes scholarships to college students who want to begin a career as foreign correspondents. Many winners secure international assignments at some of the most prestigious news outlets in the world.

In April 2008, the OPC relaunched its website to include community features for members like forums, commenting, page sharing through email/print/download, and RSVP and bill pay functions.

Awards
, there are 22 awards presented:

See also
Foreign Correspondents' Club

Notes and references

External links
Overseas Press Club of America official website
Overseas Press Club Foundation official website
Overseas Press Club at The WNYC Archives

American journalism organizations
Foreign correspondents' clubs
Journalism-related professional associations
Professional associations based in the United States
Non-profit organizations based in New York City
Organizations established in 1939
1939 establishments in New York City